Vanylven Church is a parish church of the Church of Norway in the municipality of Vanylven in Møre og Romsdal county, Norway. It is located in the village of Slagnes, on the shore of the Vanylvsfjorden. It is the church for the Vanylven parish which is part of the Søre Sunnmøre prosti (deanery) in the Diocese of Møre. The white, plastered brick church was built in a rectangular design in 1864 using plans drawn up by the architect Georg Andreas Bull. The church seats about 320 people.

History
In 1844, the parish of Vanylven considered expanding the Old Vanylven Church since it was too small for the population, but this was not carried out. A law passed in 1851 required the church be able to seat at least 30% of the people living in the parish, so it had to be enlarged or replaced. Years of debate ensued and eventually it was decided that a new church would be built. In 1863, the old church was torn down and the same year, a new Vanylven Church was built in the nearby village of Slagnes. The new church was designed by Georg Andreas Bull, and the same drawings were later used for building a new Davik Church nearby. Construction was completed in the fall of 1863, and a number of items were transferred from the old church. The new church was consecrated on 21 February 1864. In 1959, a large new sacristy was built on the northeast end of the building. The new sacristy included a basement where there are bathrooms.

See also
List of churches in Møre

References

Vanylven
Churches in Møre og Romsdal
Rectangular churches in Norway
Brick churches in Norway
19th-century Church of Norway church buildings
Churches completed in 1864
1864 establishments in Norway